Heather Goldenhersh is an American actress. She has appeared on Broadway, on television, and in feature films.

Early life 
Goldenhersh was born in Chicago, Illinois and grew up in St. Louis. She has said that she is "half-Jewish by adoption on my father's side and Greek Orthodox (Christian) on my mother's side". She was a fundamentalist Christian for several years, but ultimately drifted away from the faith in her mid-20s.

Personal life
Goldenhersh is married to her Doubt co-star, Irish actor, Brían F. O'Byrne.

Filmography

Television

Movies

Broadway

Shows

Awards and nominations

References

External links 
 
 

American film actresses
American television actresses
American people of Greek descent
Living people
Actresses from Chicago
20th-century American actresses
21st-century American actresses
Theatre World Award winners
Year of birth missing (living people)